Whale Cove (ᑎᑭᕋᕐᔪᐊᖅ in Inuktitut syllabics) (Tikiraqjuaq, meaning "long point"), is a hamlet located  south southwest of Rankin Inlet,  northeast of Arviat, in the Kivalliq Region, Nunavut, Canada, on the western shore of Hudson Bay.

The community is named for the many beluga whales which congregate off the coast. Many of the inhabitants hunt these whales every fall and use their by-products for their oil and food. Whale Cove, initially settled by three distinct Inuit groups (one inland and two coastal), is a relatively traditional community: 95% Inuit, who still wear fur, hunt, fish, eat raw meat and fish. Several bowhead whales may appear in the area as well. Whale Cove is on the polar bear migration route.

The terrain is Arctic tundra, this consists mostly of rocks, mosses and lichens.

History

Inuit in the Whale Cove area traded whale oil, baleen, furs, leather and walrus tusks with the Hudson's Bay Company (HBC) since the mid-18th century when the HBC established their trading post at Churchill, Manitoba.

Relocations 1950s
In the 1950s and 1960s Inuit were relocated in a series of moves from one hamlet to another, some of them arriving in Whale Cove, a hamlet created by the federal government for these Inuit groups. Some came from Ennadai Lake via Arviat to Whale Cove, other came from Back River via Garry Lake then the Baker Lake area to Whale Cove. Their hunting experience was based almost entirely on "inland caribou herds that had thinned by the 1950s and left many families hungry. Coastal dwelling Inuit from Rankin Inlet and Arviat were relocated to Whale Cove from nearby coastal communities in order to aid the inlanders in adapting to a marine subsistence economy."

Ennadai Lake relocations 1950–1960s
In the late 1960s a famine swept the land. Inuit were forced to walk towards places like Arviat to escape the desperation. Survivors who couldn't walk were airlifted to Whale Cove, Baker Lake and Rankin Inlet.

Demographics 

Self-government
In 1973, the Inuit Tapirisat of Canada (now Inuit Tapiriit Kanatami) initiated the Inuit Land Use and Occupancy Project and anthropologist David Hoffman conducted fieldwork in Whale Cove as part of a team of experts contributing to this project. The project under Milton Freeman, documented the total Inuit land use area of the Northwest Territories, then stretching from the Mackenzie River to east Baffin Island, to provide information in support of the fact that Inuit have used and occupied this vast northern land since time immemorial and that they still use and occupy it to this day.

Economic development
Whale Cove companies and organizations, community and government services, the Kivalliq Inuit Association, Issatik Co-op, Nunavut Arctic College, Calm Air, Nolinor Aviation, Service Canada, the Royal Canadian Mounted Police, Sakku Development Corp., Nunavut Development Corp, Agnico Eagle, The North West Company, Kivalliq Partners in Development and ED&T. made presentations at the first Economic Development Day held at the Inuglak School gymnasium, in Whale Cove on 20 September 2011.

According to the Nunavut Planning Commission Whale Cove region's potential non-renewable resources include: "gold, diamonds, uranium, base metals, and nickel-copper platinum group elements (PGEs)".

Broadband communications 
The community has been served by the Qiniq network since 2005. Qiniq is a fixed wireless service to homes and businesses, connecting to the outside world via a satellite backbone. The Qiniq network is designed and operated by SSi Canada. In 2017, the network was upgraded to 4G LTE technology, and 2G-GSM for mobile voice. In September 2019, Bell Mobility established a data tower and provides high-speed mobile and internet connectivity within the community. Telus users will also receive coverage due to the Bell/TELUS cellular partnership.

Climate
Summers typically last four months.

Notable people from Whale Cove
John Adjuk (1913 Back River -2006 Whale Cove) moved with his family to Whale Cove in March 1964 from the Baker Lake area. Originally from the Back River area (Chantrey Inlet) north of Baker Lake, living the traditional way of life on the land, he moved to the Garry Lake area. Following famine in the Garry Lake area, he was evacuated to Baker (Lake Qamanittuaq) in 1955. In 1955 they returned to Garry Lake but in early 1958 the family of five was evacuated to the community of Baker Lake when famine struck the land. The Hanningajurmiut, or Hanningaruqmiut, or Hanningajulinmiut ("the people of the place that lies across") lived at Garry Lake, south of the Utkuhiksalingmiut. Many Hanningajurmiut starved in 1958 when the caribou bypassed their traditional hunting grounds, but the 31 who survived were relocated to Baker. Most never returned permanently to Garry Lake. In March, 1964, the Adjuk family, which now included six daughters, moved to Whale Cove because it was thought the hunting and fishing was better.

Education
Nunavut Arctic College has a branch in Whale Cove.

Notes

Citations

See also
List of municipalities in Nunavut
 Levinia Brown

References

Further reading
 Inuglak School (Whale Cove, Nunavut). The Lonely Inukshuk. Markham, Ont: Scholastic Book Fairs, 1999.

External links
 Whale Cove at the Government of Nunavut
 Whale Cove

Populated places on Hudson Bay
Hamlets in the Kivalliq Region
Road-inaccessible communities of Nunavut